David Thomas Smith (born 13 June 1970) is a former English cricketer.  Smith was a left-handed batsman who bowled right-arm medium pace.  He was born in Salford, Lancashire.

Smith made his debut for Cumberland in the 1992 Minor Counties Championship against Lincolnshire.  He played Minor counties cricket for Cumberland from 1992 to 1994, including a single MCCA Knockout Trophy match in his final season.  In his time with Cumberland, Smith played a single List A match in the 1994 NatWest Trophy against Leicestershire.  In the match he scored 17 runs before being dismissed by Alan Mullally.

He had previously played Second XI cricket for the Lancashire Second XI and the Derbyshire Second XI.

References

External links
David Smith at ESPNcricinfo
David Smith at CricketArchive

1970 births
Living people
Cricketers from Salford
English cricketers
Cumberland cricketers